The Blackburn Sidecar  was a two-seat ultra-light aircraft built by the Blackburn Aeroplane & Motor Company at Brough in 1919. There is no evidence that it ever flew.

Development 
The side-by-side two-seat Sidecar was built by the Blackburn Aeroplane & Motor Co. Ltd. at Brough in 1919 for Mr.K.M Smith.

It was a small mid-winged aircraft, with wings and other flying surfaces of constant chord.  It had no fixed tail surfaces. The triangular cross-section fuselage was unusually deep, such that the undercarriage cross-axle was attached to the keel or bottom longeron.

The sole Sidecar, eventually registered G-EALN on 26 August 1920, was exhibited at Harrods Department store in Knightsbridge during March 1919. It did not fly with the low-powered Gnat.  About July 1921 the aircraft was sold to Mr. Haydon-White, Blackburn's London manager who had it re-engined with a  Anzani radial.  By October 1921 it was logged as unairworthy.  There is no record of it flying during these four months.

Specifications (Gnat)

References

Notes

Bibliography

 Jane's All the Worlds Aircraft 1919

Sidecar
1910s British sport aircraft
Single-engined tractor aircraft
Mid-wing aircraft
Aircraft first flown in 1919